Lck-interacting transmembrane adapter 1 is a protein that in humans is encoded by the LIME1 gene.

LIME1 is a raft-associated transmembrane adaptor phosphoprotein that is preferentially expressed in hemopoietic cells, particularly T cells (Brdickova et al., 2003; Hur et al., 2003).[supplied by OMIM]

References

Further reading